Mehmet Kutay Şenyıl (born 6 March 1987) is a Turkish professional footballer who is currently plays for Çayırovaspor.

References

1987 births
Living people
Sportspeople from İzmit
Turkish footballers
Fenerbahçe S.K. footballers
Maltepespor footballers
Association football defenders